Italian Championships or Italian Championship may refer to:

Athletics
Italian Athletics Championships
Italian Athletics Clubs Championships
Italian Athletics Indoor Championships
Italian Cross Country Championships
Italian Long Distance Mountain Running Championships
Italian Mountain Running Championships
Italian Skyrunning Championships
Italian Vertical Kilometer Championships
Italian Winter Throwing Championships

Motorsports
 Italian Championship Group 6 (1976–1983) (racing cars)
 Italian F4 Championship (racing cars)
 Italian Formula Renault Championship (2000-2012) (formula Renault)
 Italian Formula Three Championship (formula three)
 Italian GT Championship (sports cars)
 Italian Rally Championship (rally)
 Italian Superturismo Championship (touring-type sports cars)

Team sport
 Italian Baseball League (baseball)
 Lega Basket Serie A (basketball)
 Divisione Nazionale (football, 1926–1929)
 Serie A (football)
 Serie A (handball)
 Serie A (ice hockey)
 Lega Nazionale Hockey (roller hockey)
 Serie A (rugby union)
 Italian Volleyball League (volleyball)
 Serie A1 (water polo)

Others
 Italian Alpine Ski Championships (alpine skiing)
 Italian Artistic Gymnastics Championships (artistic gymnastics)
 Italian National Badminton Championships (badminton)
 Italian Chess Championship (chess)
 Italian Curling Championship (curling)
 Italian National Road Race Championships (cycling)
 Italian National Cyclo-cross Championships (cyclo-cross)
 Italian Figure Skating Championships (figure skating)
 Italian Tennis Championships (tennis)